Hermatobates is a genus of wingless marine bugs placed as the sole genus in the family Hermatobatidae that are sometimes known as coral-treaders. They are quite rare and known only from coral reefs in the Indo-Pacific region. During low tide, they move over the water surface not unlike the more familiar water-striders around coral atolls and reefs and stay submerged in reef crevices during high tide.

The genus was described by the amateur entomologist Rev. George Carpenter in 1892 on the basis of a single specimen obtained from Mabuiag Island in the Torres Straits by Alfred Cort Haddon. The species was described as H. haddoni. The species are very rare and difficult to observe in life. Most subsequent specimens in the genus have been captured using neuston drag nets, sometimes with artificial lights at night. They are differentiated from the striders in the Gerridae by the presence of three tarsal segments on all the legs and with pre-apical claws only on the fore-tarsi. The pronotum is short while the meso- and metanotum are fused.

Species 
At least 13 species are known:
 Hermatobates armatus 
Hermatobates bredini 
Hermatobates djiboutensis 
Hermatobates haddoni 
Hermatobates hawaiiensis 
Hermatobates kula 
Hermatobates lingyangjiaoensis 
Hermatobates marchei 
Hermatobates palmyra 
Hermatobates schuhi 
Hermatobates singaporensis 
Hermatobates tiarae 
 Hermatobates weddi

References

Marine insects
Heteroptera genera
Taxa named by George Herbert Carpenter